Walloway (formerly Rye) is a locality in the Australian state of South Australia located about  north of the state capital of Adelaide and about  north of the municipal seat of Orroroo.

The principal land use within the locality is primary production.

History
The Government Town of Walloway was surveyed in November 1881 and proclaimed with the name Rye on 30 March 1882. It was renamed as Walloway in 1940 in order to match the Wallaway railway station, which had been so named since 1851. The government town officially ceased to exist on 30 June 1988.

Being spread over the boundary joining the Hundred of Coomooroo and Hundred of Walloway, the local government first was established for the town in 1888 with the formation of the District Council of Orroroo. From 1997, the hundreds of Coomooroo and Wallaway, among thirteen hundreds in the area, became part of the larger District Council of Orroroo Carrieton.

Boundaries for the locality were formalised in December 1999 (including "the ceased Government Town of Walloway") and it was formally given the "long established name" of Wallaway, which is derived from a "native name for a large plain frequented by wild turkeys."

Train crash 
On 16 November 1901 a northbound train with an engine driver and fireman aboard, carrying flour and copper ore, and a southbound train also with an engine driver and a fireman aboard, carrying 170 bullocks consigned by Sir Sydney Kidman, collided at Walloway. The firemen from both locomotives were killed; one of the drivers was seriously injured. Many cattle were also lost. A monument was erected at the site in 2001 commemorating the event.

Governance
Walloway is located within the federal division of Grey, the state electoral district of Stuart and the local government area of the District Council of Orroroo Carrieton.

References

Towns in South Australia
Mid North (South Australia)